Ronald R. Barcena (born June 3, 1975) is a Filipino politician. A member of the NPC party, he was elected as a Member of the Sangguniang Panlalawigan of Rizal Province, representing the 1st District of Antipolo, beginning in 2010. Prior to his election to Rizal Province, Barcena was elected to three terms as Councilor and Sangguniang Kabataan President of Antipolo.

References

People from Antipolo
1975 births
Living people
Nationalist People's Coalition politicians
Members of the Rizal Provincial Board
Filipino city and municipal councilors